Apolda is a town in central Thuringia, Germany, the capital of the Weimarer Land district. It is situated in the center of the triangle Weimar–Jena–Naumburg near the river Ilm, c.  east by north from Weimar. Apolda station lies on the Halle–Bebra railway, which is part of the main line from Berlin to Frankfurt.

History
Apolda was first mentioned in 1119. Until 1633 it was seat of a family of nobles, the Vitzthums, which acted relatively independent. Between 1633 and World War I Apolda was property of the University of Jena. Nevertheless, from 1691 to 1809 Apolda was part of the Duchy of Saxe-Weimar and from 1809 to 1918 of Saxe-Weimar-Eisenach (after 1815 Grand Duchy). Around 1700, the knitting industry began to grow, so that finally, at the end of the 19th century, Apolda was the wealthiest town of the whole region. On July 12–17, 1945, Apolda issued a set of three of its own postage stamps. They depicted a new sprig growing up out of a tree stump. After World War II, Thuringia became part of the German Democratic Republic. Up to German reunification, Apolda still was famous for its textile industries. Since then, a notable economic decay has taken place.

Mayors
Ernst Stegmann was the long-time mayor of Apolda with 33 years in office (1901-1934).

Main sights
It possesses several churches and monuments to the Dobermann Pinscher dog breed, which was created in Apolda, and to Christian Zimmermann (1759–1842), who, by introducing the hosiery and cloth manufacture, made Apolda one of the most important places in Germany in these branches of industry. By 1900 it also had had extensive dyeworks, bell foundries, and manufactures of steam engines, boilers, cars and bicycles. After German reunification the majority of these had to be closed down for economical reasons.

The most important sights are:
 St. Martin's Church (1119), details in Romanesque, Gothic and Baroque style
 Town Hall (1558/9), in Renaissance style
 Castle (16th/17th century)
 Railway viaduct (1845/46)
 Zimmermann factory building (1880–1882)
 Lutherkirche (1894)
 St. Boniface's Church (1894)
 Glocken museum (Bell museum)
The largest free hanging bell in the world, the Decke Pitter of Cologne Cathedral, was made in Apolda. Apolda also has mineral springs.

Twin towns – sister cities

Apolda is twinned with:
 Mark, Sweden
 Rapid City, United States
 San Miniato, Italy
 Seclin, France

Notable people
Karl Friedrich Louis Dobermann (1834–1894), first breeder of the Doberman Pinscher
Otto Franz Georg Schilling (1911–1973), mathematician
Albert Raisner (1922–2011), musician and TV host
Klaus Agthe (born 1930), businessman and author
Mike Mohring (born 1971), politician (CDU)
Erich Seidel (ophthalmologist), ophthalmologist known for Seidel test and Seidel sign

See also
Prager house

References

Weimarer Land
Grand Duchy of Saxe-Weimar-Eisenach